The following is a list of characters that first appeared in the ITV soap opera Coronation Street in 1990, by order of first appearance.

Vicky McDonald

Vicky Arden (also McDonald) was played by Helen Warburton in 1990 and Chloe Newsome from 1991 to 1998. She is Alec Gilroy's (Roy Barraclough) granddaughter and the ex-wife of Steve McDonald (Simon Gregson). After first appearing in January 1990, Vicky visits Coronation Street when her parents, Tim and Sandra Arden, arrange for Alec and Bet to collect her from the train station when she arrives from boarding school. This was so that they could attend the funeral of Sandra's mother, Joyce; Sandra did not want Vicky to attend, as it would be too upsetting for her. However, on the day of Vicky's arrival, the police arrive at the Rovers Return Inn to tell Alec that Tim and Sandra have died in a car crash. Her grandfather Alec and his wife Bet (Julie Goodyear) therefore become her legal guardians as Vicky is still only 14 years old.

Vicky goes to a private boarding school and owns a horse called Saracen, so holidays in a back street pub are not an attractive option. However, when she meets Steve McDonald, it is some compensation. Alec desperately tries to separate the couple but fails. She resists his sexual advances for a short time, until finally she loses her virginity to him. This is not important to Steve, and he also dates nurse Alison Rathbone. They then both dump him. After Alec leaves to go and work in Southampton, Vicky continues to return to the Rovers and treats Bet as her grandmother. On reaching her 18th birthday, Vicky inherits £240,000 from her parents. To Bet's distress, Vicky immediately abandons her studies and decides the money would be better than her schooling. She visits Alec for a while to explain her decision to him. When she returns, she is keen to confide in old flame Steve, but he is seeing hairdresser Fiona Middleton (Angela Griffin). However, Vicky gets his attention when she invests £1,500 in his T-shirt company. Despite this, she loses her money when an order for Costello's nightclub falls through owing to the venue going bust.

Rather than put her off, this inspires Vicky to enrol on a Business Studies course at the local technical college, and she becomes Steve's business partner, insisting that she has control of the finances, annoying Fiona. This gets worse when Vicky and Steve go to Dublin for a 'business' weekend. Fiona dumps him, leaving the way clear for Vicky. She seduces him easily and they announce their engagement at Steve's 21st birthday party in 1995, shocking everybody and incensing Bet. Alec returns for a brief period, to convince Vicky to end the relationship, to no avail; he even offers Steve £5,000 not to marry Vicky. Eventually, the pair marry in St. Lucia, and Bet gives her blessing, as she knows that Vicky is happy.

After their marriage, Vicky and Steve have a long honeymoon in the Caribbean and America. When they return, they turn their attention to the business, which needs another injection of capital, again provided by Vicky. Their relationship struggles, thanks to Steve spending Vicky's money, and the final straw comes when he is arrested on Christmas Day 1995 for buying stolen whisky. He is guilty, but persuades Vicky to bribe Malcolm Fox to say that Steve did not know that the whisky was stolen. Steve is freed, and they assume that they are safe. However, the police discover the bribery when Malcolm's wife confesses. Vicky and Steve are arrested and they stand trial, blaming each other, and both are found guilty. Steve is sentenced to two years in prison, and Vicky is given a one-year suspended sentence. She decides to get on with her life without Steve, and enrols in a hotel management course at an exclusive college in Switzerland. She leaves in June 1996, and divorces Steve whilst he is in prison.

Vicky returns to the Street with a bang at Christmas 1998. She accidentally hits Steve's car as she parks her car outside the Rovers while visiting Alec. Vicky has blossomed into a mature young woman, a far cry from the spoilt, impressionable teen that came to the Rovers many years before. She has just bought a wine bar in Brighton, and wants advice from her grandfather. Alec is having problems with the Duckworths, who are now licensees at the pub, and is getting very despondent, so Vicky persuades him to go into partnership with her, and Alec sells the Rovers to the recently widowed Natalie Barnes (Denise Welch). They leave Coronation Street together with hopes of a great future.

In November 1999, Steve and his friend, Vikram Desai (Chris Bisson), are heading to Calais to buy cigarettes and alcohol. Vikram discovers they are going via Brighton to see Vicky. On arrival at "Vicky's" - the wine bar she owns - Steve discovers that she is about to remarry. He plans to rekindle his relationship with her so that he can get his hands on her money and business, betting Vikram £100 that he can stop the wedding. It transpires that Vicky's bar is actually in trouble, as she asks Bet for a loan, but she refuses. Steve successfully seduces Vicky, and she admits that she cannot marry her fiancé, Robert. She also tells him she is broke, and the wine bar is losing money. He promises to pick her up later and return to Weatherfield, but Steve and Vikram leave without her. Vicky realises that she has been stood up, so Bet takes her back to the bar, and Vicky realises she does want to marry Robert after all. In 2002, Bet stated that Vicky was happily married.

Tim Arden

Tim Arden is husband of Sandra Arden and father of Vicky McDonald. Tim makes sparing appearances when his father-in-law Alec Gilroy visits the family. Tim makes his final appearance on 13 June 1990. 13 months later, shortly after Sandra was seen again on screen without Tim, a police sergeant arrives at the Rovers Return Inn to tell Alec that both Tim and Sandra have died in a car crash en route to Sandra's mother, Joyce's funeral.

Sandra Arden

Sandra Arden (also Gilroy) is the daughter of Alec and Joyce Gilroy.

Alec decides to contact his daughter to make up for the last twenty years and gets Sandra's address from his ex-wife Joyce. After discovering that Sandra lives in a big house in Cheshire with her husband Tim and their daughter, Vicky.

After initial misunderstandings between the Ardens and the Gilroys, Sandra tells Alec that he could keep in touch with them. In July 1991, Joyce dies and Sandra asks Alec to meet Vicky at boarding school and to let her stay at the Rovers Return so that she and Tim can attend Joyce's funeral in Whitby.

Before the Gilroys set off for the train station, a Police Sergeant arrives to tell Alec that Sandra and Tim have both died in a car crash.

Des Barnes

Steph Barnes

Stephanie "Steph" Barnes (née Jones), played by Amelia Bullmore, made her first screen appearance on 12 February 1990 and departed on 2 September 1991, she later returned for two separate stints in April 1992 and September 1995, making her final appearance on 4 October 1995. Steph and her husband Des Barnes (Philip Middlemiss) arrived in Coronation Street shortly after getting married, they moved into one of the newly built houses. As a wedding present, Steph's father and builder of the houses Maurice Jones (Alan Moore) sold the newly built 6 Coronation Street to the couple at cost price. The Barnes spent their honeymoon in Majorca after which they began settling into the Street. Steph worked at the perfume counter, and Des as a bookie's clerk. Steph and Des shared a devilish sense of humour; when Steph flirted with Kevin Webster (Michael Le Vell) for a laugh, making him scared of her, Des bet her that she couldn't shave off his moustache. Steph won the bet by throwing a housewarming party and luring Kevin upstairs and going at him with scissors.

Architect Simon Beatty (Peter Gowen) commenced work on a warehouse next door to Steph's work. He would often come into the store to flirt with Steph, which she enjoyed. An affair began and Steph drifted away from Des. While on a date, Steph and Simon were seen kissing by her next-door neighbour Derek Wilton (Peter Baldwin). Steph wasn't ready for Des to know the truth and asked Derek to keep what he'd seen to himself. Although he and his wife Mavis (Thelma Barlow) didn't tell Des, they made such nuisances of themselves lecturing Steph on her infidelity that Des warned Derek to stop pestering his wife, leading Mavis to blow Steph's secret in Derek's defence. Steph made the decision to leave Des for Simon. Des made one last attempt to stop Steph from leaving him by slashing her suitcases, but Steph moved out regardless.

Over time, Simon grew jealous and possessive and Steph left him for another man. In order to avoid a messy break-up, she told Simon that there was nobody else and the relationship had just run its course. To throw Simon off the scent, Steph turned up at Des's door, asking if she could stay in the spare room for a few nights. Staying with Des made sense as Simon knew that Steph would never reconcile with him so she could use it as a refuge until the dust settled. However, her arrival sent out the wrong message to Des, who was eager for a reconciliation and let his current girlfriend Raquel Wolstenhulme (Sarah Lancashire) walk out on him after he sided with Steph against her in an argument. When Steph saw that Des was getting his hopes up, she confessed that she had a new boyfriend, breaking his heart again. A year later, Des and Steph began divorce proceedings.

Nearly two years after this, Des bumped into Steph who was working at a fast food outlet. Steph was heavily pregnant but she and the father were no longer in a relationship and she was living in a grotty bedsit. Des helped Steph find a flat and paid £500 as a deposit for her. Steph asked Des if he wanted to start again but Des didn't love her anymore and wanted to leave her in the past.

Jackie Ingram

Jacqueline Rachel "Jackie" Ingram (also Baldwin), played by Shirin Taylor, made her first screen appearance on 8 August 1990 and departed on 24 July 1991, later returning for two episodes on 13 April and 15 June 1992.

Jackie was Peter Ingram's widow who fell for Mike Baldwin's charms and became his second wife. The marriage lasted a week before Jackie discovered he had only been after her money and had used some of it to help out his girlfriend, Alma Sedgewick. She threatened Mike with her shotgun before leaving him. Mike was given a tidy sum of money as a pay-off for a quick divorce.

Angie Freeman

Angela "Angie" Freeman moved into 7 Coronation Street to share with Jenny Bradley, into the room vacated by Flick and Joanne Khan. She was a free-spirited student studying Design at University and a woman who knew her own mind. In March 1991, Curly Watts moved in and they quickly became very close – but more as brother and sister than lovers, until one night when they had too much red wine and ended up in bed together. Both regretted it the next morning, but Curly always hoped that their relationship might develop into something more. After graduating, Angie was short of work, and worked unhappily for Mike Baldwin, and more happily for Hanif Ruparell. She found another soulmate in Des Barnes, but went on to have a rather confused and painful romance with Neil Mitchell.

When she left Weatherfield for Mexico in March 1993 to study Aztec design, she left behind a few broken hearts.

In December 1996, she called back on Weatherfield as a designer for Kbec - much to the annoyance of her former boss, Mike Baldwin, but Kbec troubles meant that by the following March they were both no longer in Kbec's employ. Angie returned to Weatherfield, and rented Des Barnes' house whilst he was on his canal barge, with the intention of setting up her own business.

Rosie Webster

Rosie Webster was born on screen during the episode broadcast on 25 December 1990. She was played by Emma Collinge until 27 December 1999, before Helen Flanagan took over the role from 23 January 2000. Rosie's storylines have included the effect that parental separation has upon a child, leading to a spell as a school bully, her rivalry with younger sister Sophie, being kidnapped by John Stape (Graeme Hawley), and her modelling ambitions. Flanagan announced her decision to leave the show in October 2011, and Rosie departed on 10 February 2012. After a five year absence, the character returned in the episode broadcast on 6 February 2017.

David Platt

David  was born on 26 December 1990, and was played by Thomas Ormson until 15 March 2000. Jack P. Shepherd succeeded Ormson in the role and made his first on screen appearance as David on 26 April 2000. David is the only child of Martin and Gail Platt (Sean Wilson and Helen Worth), although Gail had two children from her first marriage. David's storylines have included his sibling rivalry with half sister Sarah, his teenage rebellion, his relationship with Tina McIntyre (Michelle Keegan), his marriage to Kylie Turner (Paula Lane), fatherhood, and his rivalry with Kylie's ex-partner and Max's dad Callum Logan (Sean Ward). David was a central character in the show's third live episode which was aired to commemorate 60 years of ITV.

References

1990
, Coronation Street
Coronation Street